Zack Valentine (born May 29, 1957) is a former professional American football player who played linebacker in the National Football League (NFL) for four seasons for the Pittsburgh Steelers and Philadelphia Eagles. As a rookie, he won a Super Bowl ring with the Steelers in Super Bowl XIV over the Los Angeles Rams. Valentine played his prep years at John A. Holmes High School in Edenton, North Carolina.

Valentine was the head football coach of Woodbury High School, in Woodbury, New Jersey, from 2002 until his retirement following the 2012 season. Valentine had a record of 82–37 at Woodbury, recording the second most wins by a head coach, and won three state sectional titles. He lives in Logan Township. Chris Pressley, a former NFL player, played for Valentine from 2000 to 2003.

References

1957 births
Living people
African-American schoolteachers
American football linebackers
East Carolina Pirates football players
High school football coaches in New Jersey
Pittsburgh Steelers players
Philadelphia Eagles players
People from Edenton, North Carolina
People from Gloucester County, New Jersey
Players of American football from North Carolina
African-American coaches of American football
African-American players of American football
21st-century African-American people
20th-century African-American sportspeople